The Fireman's Curse is the second studio album by Australian rock band, Hunters & Collectors, which was released on 5 September 1983. It was co-produced by Konrad Plank and the band in Neunkirchen, Germany. The album peaked at No. 77 on the Australian Kent Music Report Albums Chart and No. 46 on the New Zealand Albums Chart. The lead single, "Judas Sheep", was released in August that year but failed to reach the Top 50 on the Australian singles chart, however it appeared in the top 40 in New Zealand.

It was the final album to feature percussionist Greg Perano, and the only album to feature guitarist Martin Lubran.

Background
The Fireman's Curse was prepared in June and July 1983, Hunters & Collectors had decamped from United Kingdom, where they had been based while touring Europe for six months, to Neunkirchen, West Germany. There they recorded their second album, which was co-produced with Konrad 'Conny' Plank (Can, Cluster, Kraftwerk), at Conny’s Studio, with Dave Hutchins engineering. It was released by White Label/Mushroom Records and Virgin Records on 5 September 1983.

{{quote|[Virgin] picked us up because of our commercial potential, because of our image. They saw us as having a groovy tribal funk post-nuclear Mad Max image. In actual reality ... we looked like a football team, like Australian boys. When they heard The Fireman's Curse (the second album), they dropped us because they didn't think it was commercial.|Mark Seymour (27 April 1986) |The Canberra Times}}

In Seymour's autobiography, Thirteen Tonne Theory: Life Inside Hunters and Collectors (2008), he recalled that their three-record deal with Virgin was broken when he and fellow band members insulted the label's executive, Simon Draper, by telling him that he was "a poncy little blueblood" with no faith in them. While in the UK and attempting to enter the local market, the group's members "were doing odd jobs, illegally, to keep afloat and getting steadily more miserable in the process". In the book, Seymour also describes this album as "an unmitigated disaster; an awful collection of tuneless songs full of twisted invective (mine, mostly) and apocalyptic moaning... The whole exercise was excruciatingly juvenile and a tragic waste of what could easily have been an international breakthrough record."

The album did not reach the top 50 in Australia, peaking at No. 77 on the Australian Kent Music Report Albums Chart but it did reach No. 46 on the New Zealand Albums Chart. Its lead single, "Judas Sheep", released in August, reached No. 35 in New Zealand but did not chart in Australia. They had supported their releases with an eight-week tour of Australia during August and September. After the second single, "Sway", released in November, failed to chart in both markets, the group disbanded briefly.

In July 1991 it was re-issued on CD by Mushroom Records and was subsequently re-mastered and re-issued by Liberation Music on 11 August 2003.

 Reception 

Australian musicologist, Ian McFarlane, felt The Fireman's Curse was "overly ambitious and cluttered, and generally suffered from a lack of fresh ideas". Fellow music journalist, Mark Dodshon of The Sydney Morning Herald'', predicted that it was "a likely winner" with their new material showing "there are no radical departures in musical style".

Track listing

Personnel
Credited to:

Hunters & Collectors members
 John Archer – electric bass
 Geoff Crosby – keyboards
 Doug Falconer – drums
 Martin Lubran – guitar
 Robert Miles – live sound, art director
 Greg Perano – percussion
 Mark Seymour – guitar, lead vocals

Horns of Contempt members
 Jack Howard – trumpet
 Jeremy Smith – French horn
 Michael Waters – trombone

Production details
Producer – Konrad Plank, Hunters & Collectors

Charts

References

Hunters & Collectors albums
1983 albums
Mushroom Records albums